In Japanese folklore the  is a yōkai (a supernatural monster) thought to reside in the San'in region and the city of Tottori. It was believed to be the cause of echoing.

Mythology
The Yobuko was thought to live in the mountains, and whenever a traveler entered the mountains and raised their voice, it would mimic them and call back.

In the artwork of Shigeru Mizuki, the Yobuko is depicted as a young boy with one leg, a large face, and wearing a straw rain hat. In the Oki Islands he was called  and was said to be a bird.

See also 

 Yamabiko

References 

Yōkai